Taga may refer to:

Places
Japan
 Taga District, Ibaraki, Ibaraki Prefecture
Hitachi-Taga Station in Ibaraki Prefecture
Yamashiro-Taga Station in Kyoto Prefecture
 Taga, Shiga in Shiga Prefecture
Taga-taisha, a Shinto shrine in Shiga Prefecture
Taga Taisha-mae Station in Shiga Prefecture
Ohmi Railway Taga Line in Shiga Prefecture
 Taga Castle in Tōhoku Prefecture

Other
 Taga, Bhiwani, a village in India
 Taga, Burkina Faso, a village 
 Taga, Iran, a village 
 Taga, Mali, a village 
 Țaga, a commune in Cluj County, Romania
 Taga-Roostoja, a village in Estonia
 Taga, Samoa, a village 
 Oued Taga, a town in north-eastern Algeria
 House of Taga, an archeological site on the island of Tinian, United States Commonwealth of the Northern Mariana Islands

Other uses
 Taga (surname)
 Tyagi (or Taga), an Indian surname
 3997 Taga, a main-belt asteroid
 Technical Association of the Graphic Arts, an American professional association